Gold Museum may refer to:

 Gold Museum, Bogotá, Colombia
 Gold Museum (Taiwan), Taipei, Taiwan
 Gold Museum of Peru and Weapons of the World, Lima, Peru
 Toi Gold Museum, Izu, Japan
Pre-Columbian Gold Museum, San Jose, Costa Rica

Types of museums